Gabriela Ruiz del Rincón (born 7 May 1956) is a Mexican politician affiliated with the PAN. As of 2013 she served as Senator of the LX and LXI Legislatures of the Mexican Congress representing Sinaloa.

References

1956 births
Living people
People from Sinaloa
Women members of the Senate of the Republic (Mexico)
Members of the Senate of the Republic (Mexico)
Members of the Chamber of Deputies (Mexico)
National Action Party (Mexico) politicians
21st-century Mexican politicians
21st-century Mexican women politicians
Women members of the Chamber of Deputies (Mexico)
Monterrey Institute of Technology and Higher Education alumni